Rigi railway may refer to:
 Vitznau–Rigi Railway
 Arth–Rigi Railway

See also 
Rigi Railways
Seilbahn Rigiblick
Zecca–Righi funicular